Fall Lake is a lake located north of Piseco, New York. Fish species present in the lake are rock bass, white sucker, black bullhead, smallmouth bass, yellow perch, and pickerel. There is carry down access on Fall Stream off Old Piseco Road on land owned by the Irondequoit Club.

References

Lakes of New York (state)
Lakes of Hamilton County, New York